Vasyl Vasylyovych Bondarchuk (born 12 January 1965) is a Ukrainian retired professional footballer who played as a midfielder and forward.

Honours
Podillya Khmelnytskyi
 Ukrainian Second League, Group A: 1997–98

References

External links
 
 

1965 births
Living people
People from Korosten
Soviet footballers
Ukrainian footballers
Association football midfielders
Association football forwards
SKA Kiev players
FC Papirnyk Malyn players
FC Polissya Zhytomyr players
FC Spartak Moscow players
FC SKA-Karpaty Lviv players
FC Halychyna Drohobych players
FC Bukovyna Chernivtsi players
FC Dnipro players
FC Karpaty Lviv players
FC Avanhard Zhydachiv players
FC Krystal Chortkiv players
FC Zirka Kropyvnytskyi players
FC Podillya Khmelnytskyi players
Soviet Top League players
Soviet First League players
Soviet Second League players
Ukrainian Premier League players
Ukrainian First League players
Ukrainian Second League players